The Union of Chambers and Commodity Exchanges of Turkey is a confederation of all local  chambers of commerce, industry and maritime as well as commodity exchanges in Turkey. The union was founded on March 8, 1950 as an umbrella organization in Ankara as the country's highest legal entity representing the private sector. Its president is M. Rifat Hisarcıklıoğlu since 2001.

Currently, the TOBB has 365 chambers and commodity exchanges as:
 178 chambers of commerce and industry,
 60 chambers of commerce,
 12 chambers of industry,
 2 chamber of maritime commerce and
 113 commodity of exchanges

with a membership of totalling to 1.4 million companies.

The TOBB is affiliated with Association of European Chambers of Commerce and Industry (Eurochambres), Islamic Chamber of Commerce and Industry (ICCI), Association of the Mediterranean Chambers of Commerce and Industry (ASCAME), Association of Balkan Chambers (ABC), and Association of the Black Sea Zone Chambers of Commerce and Industry (BCCI).

See also
 TOBB University of Economics and Technology
 World Trade Center Istanbul
 List of company registers

References 

1950 establishments in Turkey
Organizations based in Ankara
Trade associations based in Turkey
Organizations established in 1950
Industry in Turkey
Chambers of commerce
Commodity exchanges